Kobylański may refer to:

Places 
 Majdan Kobylański, a village in the Lublin Voivodeship, Poland

People 
 Andrzej Kobylański (born 1970), Polish footballer
 Jakub Kobylański (died 1454), Polish knight
 Jan Kobylański (born 1923),  Polish-Paraguayan businessman
 Martin Kobylański (born 1994), German-Polish footballer

See also 
 Kobylańska (disambiguation)